Devis Mangia (born 6 June 1974) is an Italian association football manager, most recently in charge of the Malta national football team.

Managing career

Early years
Mangia started his coaching career at age 30, working alongside Sean Sogliano at Eccellenza club Varese and leading them to two promotion, and back into professionalism, in three years. He successively worked at Serie D and Serie C2 clubs from the Northern Italy such as Tritium, Ivrea and Valenzana. In 2010, he returned at Varese, this time as youth coach, and guided a team composed by unknown youngsters to a spot in the Campionato Nazionale Primavera final.

Palermo
In June 2011, Mangia agreed to follow director of football Sean Sogliano at Palermo, accepting a job offer as head of the under-19 team at the Sicilian club in place of Paolo Beruatto. 

Later on 31 August, Mangia was surprisingly appointed as temporary head coach following the dismissal of Stefano Pioli, under recommendation by Sogliano; despite not having the required coaching badges, he was allowed to serve as head coach due to having been admitted to the national 2011–12 UEFA Pro license course. His first game in charge of team duties, played on 11 September against European powerhouse Inter, saw Palermo, now switched to a brand-new 4–4–2 tactical disposition, achieving an astonishing 4–3 win thanks to a brace from captain Fabrizio Miccoli. Under Mangia's tenure, Palermo significantly improved and achieved three wins and 10 points in the first five Serie A games, including a consecutive two games with a clean sheet, a relevant feat for what was the second-worst defence in the previous season; such results, together with the strict relationship between Mangia and director of football Sean Sogliano and Delio Rossi's confirmed refusal of a Palermo comeback, led the press to speculate about the possibility of him being offered a new contract as permanent head coach. Despite Sogliano's resignation as director of football on 2 November 2011, Mangia was then eventually offered a two-year contract as head coach, which he signed on 4 November 2011. On 19 December 2011, he was sacked from his position after the 2-0 derby defeat to Sicilian rivals, Catania Calcio the day before, along with assistant coach Onofrio Barone.

Italy U21
Devis Mangia has been hired as Italy's under-21 coach, replacing Ciro Ferrara. Mangia described the job as "one of the most prestigious in Italian football" and says "it is a sign of great esteem and responsibility, I'm really happy". Mangia has vowed to follow the model of Italy's senior team coach Cesare Prandelli, who guided the Azzurri to the 2012 UEFA European Football Championship final.

He guided the Azzurrini to qualification to the 2013 UEFA European Under-21 Championship, where the Italian team made it to the final, where they were ultimately defeated 4–2 by Spain. He stepped down from his role after the end of the tournament.

Spezia / Bari
On 16 December 2013, Mangia was named new head coach of ambitious Serie B club Spezia, guiding them to eighth place and qualification to the promotion playoffs, where they were defeated 1–0 by Modena in the first preliminary round and thus eliminated.

He successively left Spezia to become new head coach of Serie B promotion hopefuls Bari for the 2014–15 season, but was sacked on 16 November 2014 due to poor results.

Universitatea Craiova
On 23 May 2017, Mangia was named new head coach of Romanian team CS Universitatea Craiova. On 14 October, he was named "Coach of the First Half of the Season" by LPF. On May 27, 2018 Universitatea won the Romanian Cup.

Malta national team 
On 30 December 2019, the Malta Football Association announced the appointment of Devis Mangia as national teams’ head coach. Mangia signed a contract until 31 December 2023. Under his leadership, Malta's national team achieved the longest undefeated streak in its history (seven matches) between Sept. 6, 2020 and March 24, 2021.

On 27 September 2022, Devis Mangia was temporarily suspended by the Malta Football Association after allegedly having made sexual advances on a player in the Malta squad. A few days later, the Malta Football Association announced to have referred the case to the local police for investigation. On 7 November 2022 Mangia resigned from his position as head coach, despite denying the allegations.

Managerial statistics

Honours

Manager
Universitatea Craiova
Cupa României: 2017–18
Supercupa României: Runner-up 2018

References

External links

1974 births
Living people
People from Cernusco sul Naviglio
Italian football managers
Italian expatriate football managers
S.S.D. Varese Calcio managers
Palermo F.C. managers
CS Universitatea Craiova managers
Serie A managers
Malta national football team managers
Footballers from Lombardy
Italian expatriate sportspeople in Romania
Expatriate football managers in Romania
Expatriate football managers in Malta
Sportspeople from the Metropolitan City of Milan